Cisternas is a common Chilean surname. Some people with this surname include:
Carlos Cisternas, (born 1985), Chilean footballer
Jonathan Cisternas, Chilean footballer
María Soledad Cisternas (born 1959), Chilean lawyer, United Nations special envoy, and disability rights activist

Surnames
Spanish-language surnames